Craig's Wife is a 1936 American drama film starring Rosalind Russell as a domineering wife. It was based on the Pulitzer Prize-winning 1925 Broadway play of the same name by George Kelly (the uncle of  Grace Kelly),  and directed by Dorothy Arzner. Former MGM star William Haines was the film's production designer. Previously filmed in 1928, Craig's Wife was remade in 1950 as Harriet Craig, rewritten (and updated) as a vehicle for Joan Crawford and co-starring Wendell Corey.

Plot
The plot centers on twenty-four hours in the life of Harriet Craig (Rosalind Russell), and the home life she has created for herself and her husband. Harriet values material things more than her husband and goes to great lengths to protect her life as she has created it, regardless of what the outcomes are to those around her. The story's message is stated by Mr. Craig's aunt, Ellen Austen (Alma Kruger), who says, "Those who live for themselves, are left to themselves," as one by one, all her disgusted family and servants abandon her, leaving her entirely on her own.

Cast
 Rosalind Russell as Harriet Craig
 John Boles as Walter Craig
 Billie Burke as Mrs. Frazier
 Jane Darwell as Mrs. Harold
 Dorothy Wilson as Ethel Landreth
 Alma Kruger as Ellen Austen
 Thomas Mitchell as Fergus Passmore
 Raymond Walburn as Billy Birkmire
 Elisabeth Risdon as Mrs. Landreth
 Robert Allen as Gene Fredericks
 Nydia Westman as Mazie
 Kathleen Burke as Adelaide Passmore
 George Offerman Jr. as Tom
 Wallis Clark as Mr. Burton (uncredited)

Reception
 Louella Parsons wrote, "How well I remember 'Craig's Wife," a typical woman's play, and it's smart business therefore not only to sign Rosalind, but to hand the direction over to Dorothy Arzner, the only woman director in the business."
 "The supporting cast of 'Craig's Wife' is one of the strongest ever to be assembled in one picture."
 "This dynamic drama, baring the life of all womankind, is a screen triumph no wife or sweetheart dare miss! ... The play that electrified Broadway and won the Pulitzer prize, now lays bare the heart of a woman and her consuming passion!"
 Craig's Wife' is likely to appeal chiefly to women audiences and to attract attention mainly from those who demand that their movies be intelligent. It deserves better treatment than that for it is well made and excellently played."

References

External links
 
 
 
 

1936 films
1936 drama films
American black-and-white films
American films based on plays
Films directed by Dorothy Arzner
Columbia Pictures films
American drama films
1930s English-language films
1930s American films